Waldemar Trombetta (born 25 July 1954) is a Brazilian rower. He competed at the 1980 Summer Olympics and the 1988 Summer Olympics.

References

1954 births
Living people
Brazilian male rowers
Olympic rowers of Brazil
Rowers at the 1980 Summer Olympics
Rowers at the 1988 Summer Olympics
Place of birth missing (living people)
Pan American Games medalists in rowing
Pan American Games silver medalists for Brazil
Rowers at the 1979 Pan American Games